Cool commonly refers to:
 Cool, a moderately low temperature
 Cool (aesthetic), an aesthetic of attitude, behavior, and style

Cool or COOL may also refer to:

Economics
 Country of origin labelling
 mCOOL - US consumer legislation to enforce COOL at the grocery store

Computing
 Cool (programming language)
 COOL, a computer language used in the CLIPS tool
 Cool, an internal name of C#

Geography
 Cool (Rotterdam), Netherlands
 Cool, California, U.S.
 Cool, Texas, U.S.

Music
 Cool (band), a South Korean K-pop music group
 Cool jazz

Albums
 Cool (George Duke album) (2000)
 Lupe Fiasco's The Cool (2007)
 The Cool (character), the associated concept character
 Cool (Joyce album) (2015)

Songs
 "Cool" (Alesso song) (2015)
 "Cool" (Anthony Hamilton song) (2008)
 "Cool" (Jonas Brothers song) (2019)
 "Cool" (Le Youth song) (2013)
 "Cool" (Dua Lipa song) (2020)
 "Cool" (Gwen Stefani song) (2005)
 "Cool" (The Time song) (1981), later covered by Snoop Dogg and Prince
 "Cool" (West Side Story song) (1957)

People
 Cool (producer), American hip hop producer
 Fabien Cool (born 1972), French footballer
 Tré Cool (born 1972), American drummer (Green Day)
 Wim Cool (born 1943), Dutch politician
 LL Cool J (born 1968), American rapper

Television
 CoolTV, a Canadian television channel
 Cool TV, a Hungarian television channel
 "Cool" (Smallville), an episode of Smallville

Other uses
 COOL Award, children's book choice award
 Cool colors, a perceptual and psychological classification of colors
 Cumhall, a figure in Irish mythology
 Majesco Entertainment' NASDAQ ticker symbol
 Mr. Cool (Mr. Men), a fictional character in the Mr. Men children's book series
 Steve McQueen: popularly known as "The King of Cool"

See also
 Cool Change (disambiguation)
 Cool Kids (disambiguation)
 Kool (disambiguation)
 Mister Cool (disambiguation)